The Dark Tunnel is the first novel by "one of the giants of twentieth century crime fiction", Kenneth Millar. Millar's biography describes The Dark Tunnel as "a hybrid of old-fashioned puzzle-mystery, Buchanesque spy adventure, and Chandleresque exposé of sexual perversion.

As an author, Millar was influenced by John Buchan and Raymond Chandler, with The Dark Tunnel bearing a strong resemblance to The Thirty-Nine Steps, and echoing Chandler's hallmarks of "rough-and-ready humor, its extravagant similes, and its more lurid events and descriptions".

Millar's protagonist is Professor Robert Branch, a dichotomous character heavily influenced by the Professor Millar himself.  Branch has studied T. S. Eliot, W. C. Handy, Norse mythology, and William Shakespeare; Branch is skilled in lock picking, athletic, and possesses a Doctor of Philosophy.

References

1944 American novels
1944 debut novels
American mystery novels
American spy novels
Dodd, Mead & Co. books
novels by Ross Macdonald